Frank Scanlan may refer to:
 Frank Scanlan (baseball)
 Frank Scanlan (footballer)